Buley Rockhole is a rock-hole located in Litchfield National Park in the Northern Territory.

Naming
The rockhole is named after Norman Buley who was in charge of a government prospecting party sent to "examine areas drained by the Katherine, Fitzmaurice and Daly Rivers in 1920."

Location

It is down a short street off the road going towards Florence Falls. It is only a couple of kilometres from Litchfield and about an hour from Darwin.

Entertainment
Buley rockhole is a relaxing set of rock holes with a nice swimming area. It can get quite busy if you don't get there early.

Camping
Buley Rockholes has a vehicle-based campground with these facilities that can have camper trailers, it has cold showers, a ranger, toilets, a wood fireplace, No dogs or pets, Walking Trails, Swimming, A crocodile warning and has a Camping Fee. The campground is accessible by a 2WD, but there are no coaches and no caravans. There are no powered sites.

References

External links
Buley rockhole camping information

Litchfield National Park